Operation Wigwam involved a single test of the Mark 90 "Betty" nuclear bomb. It was conducted between Operation Teapot and Project 56 on May 14, 1955, about 500 miles (800 km) southwest of San Diego, California. 6,800 personnel aboard 30 ships were involved in Wigwam. The purpose of Wigwam was to determine the vulnerability of submarines to deeply detonated nuclear weapons, and to evaluate the feasibility of using such weapons in a combat situation. The task force commander, Admiral John Sylvester, was embarked on the task force flagship .

Detonation layout and test 
A  tow line connected the  Cherokee-class fleet tug, to the shot barge. Suspended from the tow lines of other tugs were three miniature unmanned target submarines designated "SQUAWS", each packed with cameras and telemetry instruments.

The time of detonation was 1300 hrs local Pacific Time (noon Pacific Standard Time).

See also the table at List of United States' nuclear weapons tests.

Underwater sound 
The underwater sound from the Wigwam explosion was recorded on bottom-mounted hydrophones at Point Sur and Point Arena off California, and at Kāneʻohe Bay off Oahu, Hawaii. The sound emanating from the explosive test began as an intense water shock wave. As the sound travelled away from the test point, it reflected from topographic features, such as islands and seamounts, located throughout both the North and South Pacific Basins. The reflected sound was then recorded as hours-long coda at Kaneohe and Point Sur. The sound signals provided one of the early measurements of underwater sound attenuation at low frequencies.

Detonations 
The detonations in the United States' Wigwam series are listed below:

See also 
 List of United States' nuclear weapons tests

References

Explanatory notes

Citations

External links 
 
 14 May 1955—Wigwam—A description of the WIGWAM test and its radiation aftereffects at the Comprehensive Nuclear-Test-Ban Treaty Organization Preparatory Commission Web site

1955 in California
1955 in military history
Wigwam
Articles containing video clips
Explosions in 1955
May 1955 events in Oceania
Military history of the Pacific Ocean